West Falls is a census-designated place located in Exeter Township, Wyoming County in the state of Pennsylvania.  The community is located very close to Pennsylvania Route 92 near the Susquehanna River.  As of the 2010 census the population was 382 residents.

References

Census-designated places in Wyoming County, Pennsylvania
Census-designated places in Pennsylvania